Igosi is a town and ward in Wanging'ombe district in the NJOMBE of the Tanzanian Southern Highlands. In 2016 the Tanzania National Bureau of Statistics report there were 7,437 people in the ward, from 7,204 in 2012.

References

Wards of Iringa Region